Ethmia mariannae is a moth in the family Depressariidae. It is found in Greece (the Dodecanese Islands).

References

Moths described in 2003
mariannae
Moths of Europe